João Rodrigues Esteves (c. 1700 – c. 1751) was a Portuguese composer of religious music. His surviving works number close to 100. His manuscripts are all housed in Portuguese libraries, mostly in the Lisbon Cathedral archive.  He is first mentioned in 1719 when he was brought to Rome under King João V in order to study with composer Giuseppe Ottavio Pitoni. By 1726 he was back in Portugal. In 1729 he became a master of music in the Basilica de Santa Maria Maior, the Lisbon Cathedral.
 
He wrote numerous works, among others:

Eight-voice mass completed at Rome on 8 September 1721
22 vesper psalms
2 Te Deum
Magnificat in E minor with organ

References

1700 births
1751 deaths
Portuguese composers
Portuguese male composers
18th-century Portuguese musicians
18th-century composers
18th-century male musicians
18th-century musicians